Patrick Radden Keefe (born 1976) is an American writer and investigative journalist. He is the author of five books—Chatter, The Snakehead, Say Nothing, Empire of Pain, and Rogues—and has written extensively for many publications, including The New Yorker, Slate, and The New York Times Magazine. He is a staff writer at The New Yorker.

Career 
Keefe grew up in Dorchester, Massachusetts, attended Milton Academy, and received his undergraduate degree from Columbia University in 1999. He was a resident of Schapiro Hall. He won a Marshall Scholarship in 1999, through which he received an M.Phil. in international relations from Cambridge University and an M.Sc. from the London School of Economics. After his Marshall Scholarship, Keefe returned to the U.S. and earned a J.D. degree from Yale Law School. He has since received many fellowships, including those from the Guggenheim Foundation, the Woodrow Wilson International Center for Scholars, and the Cullman Center for Scholars and Writers at the New York Public Library. He was a policy adviser in the Office of the Secretary of Defense between 2010 and 2011.

Keefe has written investigative reports on a broad array of topics and issues. Topics include a conflict over ownership of iron reserves in Guinea, policy complications faced by states legalizing recreational marijuana, and the capture of Mexican drug lord Joaquín "El Chapo" Guzmán Loera.

Keefe's story "A Loaded Gun", published in The New Yorker in 2013, received the National Magazine Award for Feature Writing. In addition to winning the National Magazine Award in 2014, he was also nominated in 2015 for "The Hunt for El Chapo" and in 2016 for "Where the Bodies are Buried", about a woman who disappeared in Northern Ireland. He won the 2019 National Book Critics Circle Award (nonfiction) for Say Nothing.

Keefe is the host of the 2020 podcast Wind of Change, which explores a rumor that the song "Wind of Change" by the Scorpions was secretly written by the CIA, rather than by the band's lead singer, Klaus Meine. Keefe won the 2021 Ambies award for "Best Podcast Host".

Books 
In Chatter: Dispatches From the Secret World Of Global Eavesdropping, Keefe describes how American security agencies, including the National Security Agency, eavesdrop on communications between people suspected of involvement in terrorism to determine the likelihood of terrorist attacks in the near future. Keefe describes the electronic intelligence-gathering apparatus for detecting this communication, often called "chatter", and examines it in the context of the September 11 attacks. In a review of the book for The New York Times, William Grimes wrote, "Mr. Keefe writes, crisply and entertainingly, as an interested private citizen rather than an expert."

Keefe's The Snakehead reported on Cheng Chui Ping and her Snakehead gang in New York City, which operated between 1984 and 2000. Keefe describes how Ping illegally smuggled immigrants from China into the U.S. on a massive scale through cargo ships. The book includes interviews with several of those immigrants, who describe their lives in the U.S. In 2000, Ping was arrested by the U.S. government and sentenced to 35 years in prison for her part in leading these operations. Janet Maslin of the New York Times called The Snakehead a "formidably well-researched book that is as much a paean to its author's industriousness as it is a chronicle of crime."

Say Nothing

Say Nothing focuses on The Troubles in Northern Ireland, beginning with the 1972 abduction and murder of Jean McConville. Keefe began researching and writing the book after reading Dolours Price's obituary in 2013.

Empire of Pain

In April 2021, his book Empire of Pain: The Secret History of the Sackler Dynasty was published by Doubleday. The book examines the Sackler family and their responsibility in the manufacturing of the painkiller OxyContin by Purdue Pharma. It is an extension of his 2017 New Yorker article "The Family That Built an Empire of Pain."

Bibliography

Books

Essays and reporting

Double Take columns from newyorker.com 
 
———————
Notes

Notes

1976 births
Living people
Columbia College (New York) alumni
American investigative journalists
Yale Law School alumni
Alumni of the London School of Economics
The New Yorker staff writers
Milton Academy alumni
American conspiracy theorists